Justice Hamid Ali Mirza (14 September 1940 — 23 October 2017) was a Pakistani lawyer. He served as Judge of the Supreme Court of Pakistan and Chief Election Commissioner of Pakistan.

Education 
Hamid Ali Mirza was born on 14 September 1940 in Jacobabad, Sindh, Pakistan. He passed matriculation examination from Jacobabad in 1954 and earned degrees of BSc and LLB in 1959 and 1961 respectively from the University of Sindh.

Professional history

Lawyer
He started his practice as an advocate (Lawyer) in 1961 until he joined the Judicial Service in 1973.

Judicial service
 Senior Civil Judge and Assistant Sessions
He joined the Provincial Judicial Service on 10 December 1973 as Senior Civil Judge and Assistant Sessions Judge and served in this capacity for almost eight years. 
 District and Session Judge
He was promoted as District and Session Judge on 26 January 1983 and he served in this capacity for over twelve years.
 Judge, High Court of Sindh
On 10 April 1995 he was elevated as a Judge of the High Court of Sindh. In addition to his duties as Judge, he also remained as Member Syndicate, University of Sindh, Jamshoro.
 Judge, Supreme Court of Pakistan
On 28 April 2000 he was elevated to Judge of the Supreme Court of Pakistan. He retired in 2005. 
 Chief Election Commissioner of Pakistan
He was appointed Chief Election Commissioner of Pakistan on 17 March 2009. As a Member of the Election Commission of Pakistan, he participated in the Workshop for Commonwealth Chief Electoral Officers held in Dhaka, Bangladesh from 7–10 April 1997.

References

External links
Onlinenews.com.pk
Ecp.gov.pk
Smlawcollege.edu.pk

1940 births
2017 deaths
Chief Election Commissioners of Pakistan
People from Jacobabad District